The Houston Cougars college football team competes as part of the NCAA Division I Football Bowl Subdivision (FBS), representing the University of Houston in the American Athletic Conference (AAC). Since the establishment of the team in 1946, Houston has appeared in 30 bowl games. The latest bowl occurred on December 23, 2022, when Houston defeated Louisiana in the 2022 Independence Bowl, which brought the Cougars' overall bowl record to thirteen wins, sixteen losses, and one tie (13–16–1).

Key

Bowl games

Notes

References
General

Specific

Houston

Houston Cougars bowl games
Houston Cougars bowl games